Simone Créantor (2 June 1948 – 12 February 2020) was a French athlete, who specialised in the shot put.

Biography
Créantor was born at Grand-Bourg. She won thirteen titles French national championships in the shot put, five outdoor and eight indoor.

She won the silver medal at the 1983 Mediterranean Games, and also in the 1987 Mediterranean Games.

Her personal best, established in 1984, is 17.45m.

Prize list

National
 French Championships in Athletics   :  
 winner of the shot put in 1972,  1981,  1985,  1986 and 1987      
 Indoors Athletics Championships of  France:  
 winner of the shot put in 1972,  1975,  1977,  1979,  1983,  1984,  1985 and 1986

Records

References

  Docathlé2003, French Athletics Federation, 2003 p. 397

1948 births
2020 deaths
People from Grand-Bourg
Guadeloupean female shot putters
Mediterranean Games silver medalists for France
Mediterranean Games medalists in athletics
Athletes (track and field) at the 1983 Mediterranean Games
Athletes (track and field) at the 1987 Mediterranean Games